Inner Sphere may refer to:
Inner sphere complex, a type of ion-surface binding
Inner sphere electron transfer, a chemical reaction involving closely associated atoms
Inner Sphere (BattleTech), the primary setting of the BattleTech universe